Lieutenant General Sean Barry MacFarland (born February 12, 1959) is a retired three-star general who served in the United States Army. 

In 2015 MacFarland, then commanding III Corps, was selected as commander of the coalition against ISIS in Syria and Iraq. MacFarland and III Corps thus became responsible for Combined Joint Task Force – Operation Inherent Resolve (CJTF-OIR). MacFarland handed over command to Lieutenant General Stephen J. Townsend and the XVIII Airborne Corps in August 2016. He became deputy commanding general and chief of staff for the United States Army Training and Doctrine Command in April 2017, and retired from active duty 27 February 2018.

Career
MacFarland was commissioned into the United States Army in 1981 and has served in armor and cavalry units throughout his career. He was a cavalry platoon leader and troop executive officer in 2nd Squadron, 3rd Armored Cavalry Regiment at Ft. Bliss, Texas, the Squadron S4 and the commander of A Troop, 3rd Squadron, 12th Cavalry in Buedingen, Germany, S3 and XO of 3rd and 1st Squadrons, respectively, of the 4th Cavalry in Schweinfurt, Germany and in Bosnia. He commanded 2nd Battalion, 63rd Armor in Macedonia and Vilseck, Germany. He also commanded 1st Brigade Combat Team (Ready First), 1st Armored Division in Friedberg, Germany and in Iraq, where the Ready First fought in Tal Afar, Sinjar, Hit and Ramadi. Most recently, he was Commanding General of Fort Bliss, Texas and the 45th Commanding General of the 1st Armored Division (Old Ironsides).

Other assignments included: US Army's lead action officer for combat development of National Missile Defense interceptors at Ft. Bliss, Deputy Regimental S3 of 3rd ACR during Desert Shield/Storm, Deputy G3, 1st Infantry Division in Wuerzburg, Germany; Chief of the 3rd Army Commander's Initiative Group at Ft. McPherson, Georgia and in Kuwait during Operation Desert Thunder; Aide de Camp for the US Army Europe CG in Heidelberg and Sarajevo, Bosnia-Herzegovina; Chief of Future Operations for Combined/Joint Task Force 7 in Baghdad, Iraq; G3 of V Corps in Heidelberg, Germany; Chief of the Joint Staff J5's Iraq Division in Washington, DC; Commanding General of Joint Task Force North at Ft. Bliss, Deputy Commanding General for Leader Development and Education and the Deputy Commandant of the Command and General Staff College at Fort Leavenworth, Kansas, and was dual-hatted as Deputy Chief of Staff for Operations for the International Security Assistance Force in Afghanistan and the Deputy Commanding General for Operations for US Forces Afghanistan.

Awards
MacFarland is a graduate of the United States Military Academy, the Command and General Staff College, the School of Advanced Military Studies, and the Industrial College of the Armed Forces. He also earned a Master of Science degree in Aerospace Engineering at Georgia Tech.

Commands
He commanded 1st Brigade Combat Team, 1st Armored Division during the Iraq War and the Battle of Ramadi in 2006. He is the former Deputy Chief of Staff for Operations for the International Security Assistance Force in Afghanistan. MacFarland was previously the Commanding General of Fort Bliss and the 1st Armored Division, and the Commanding General of III Corps at Fort Hood.

References

1959 births
United States Army personnel of the Gulf War
United States Army personnel of the Iraq War
United States Army personnel of the War in Afghanistan (2001–2021)
Living people
Recipients of the Distinguished Service Medal (US Army)
Recipients of the Defense Superior Service Medal
Recipients of the Legion of Merit
United States Army generals